The 1981 South American Championships in Athletics were held in La Paz, Bolivia, between 5 and 8 November.

Medal summary

Men's events

Women's events

A = affected by altitude

Medal table

See also
1981 in athletics (track and field)

External links
 Men Results – GBR Athletics
 Women Results – GBR Athletics
 Medallists

S
South American Championships in Athletics
A
South
1981 in South American sport